The Northcutt Plantation is a Southern plantation with a historic house and slave quarters located in McMinnville, Tennessee, USA. The two-story house was built circa 1840. It has been listed on the National Register of Historic Places since May 12, 1975.

References

Plantation houses in Tennessee
Buildings and structures in Warren County, Tennessee
Antebellum architecture
Houses on the National Register of Historic Places in Tennessee
National Register of Historic Places in Warren County, Tennessee